The 2006–07 Segunda División de México season was split in two tournaments Apertura and Clausura. Segunda División was the third-tier football league of Mexico. The season was played between 26 August 2006 and 26 May 2007.

Teams

South Zone

Central Zone 
{{Location map+ |Mexico |width=700|float=right |caption=Location of teams in the 2007–08 Segunda División Central Zone |places=

{{Location map~ |Mexico|mark=TransparentPlaceholder.png |marksize=1 |lat=24|long=-117|label=}}

Bajío Zone

Western Zone

Northern Zone

Torneo Apertura

Regular season

Southern Zone

Central Zone

Bajío Zone

Western Zone

Northern Zone

Liguilla de Ascenso

Liguilla de Filiales

Torneo Clausura

Regular season

Southern Zone

Central Zone

Bajío Zone

Western Zone

Northern Zone

Liguilla de Ascenso

Liguilla de Filiales

Promotion Final
The Promotion Final is a series of matches played by the champions of the tournaments Apertura and Clausura, the game is played to determine the winning team of the promotion to Liga de Ascenso. 
The first leg was played on 24 May 2007, and the second leg was played on 27 May 2007.

See also 
Primera División de México Apertura 2006
Primera División de México Clausura 2007
2006–07 Primera División A season

References

External links 
 Official website of Liga Premier
 Magazine page  

Segunda División de México seasons
1